Grant Esau (born 21 April 1998) is a South African cricketer. He made his first-class debut for South Western Districts in the 2016–17 Sunfoil 3-Day Cup on 12 January 2017. He made his List A debut for South Western Districts in the 2016–17 CSA Provincial One-Day Challenge on 15 January 2017.

References

External links
 

1998 births
Living people
South African cricketers
South Western Districts cricketers
Place of birth missing (living people)